The Portal 20 de Julio is one of the terminal or head stations that are part of TransMilenio, the bus rapid mass transit system of Bogotá. It is located in the southeast of the city, on Carrera 5A between 30A Sur and 32 Sur streets. There is also a pedestrian entrance on Calle 31 Sur. It is the end of the  line.

Surroundings 
It serves the Suramérica, Veinte de Julio, San Isidro, Villa de los Alpes I, and Bello Horizonte districts and surrounding areas. Nearby are Serafina Park, the South American and Florentino Gonzalez schools, Santuario del Niño Jesús del Veinte de Julio and the SuperCADE 20 de Julio.

History 
This station is part of the Transmilenio Phase III that began to be built at the end of 2009 and was opened in 2012. It was developed at a site where the Moore pipe factory operated.

The station has two platforms for buses, an access building, an administrative building and a fairground where the street vendors of the sector of 20 de Julio were to be relocated, and which consists of a basement, two floors and a small square. In addition, a garage was built to house up to 56 articulated buses and 126 bi-articulated buses and a bicycle rack with capacity for 256 bicycles.

Station services

Main services

Dual Service

Feeder Routes

On November 17, 2012, the operation of feeder routes to this station began:

 Juan Rey loop
 Península loop
 Altamira loop
 Tihuaque loop
 Villa del Cerro loop
 Los Libertadores loop
 Resurrección loop

References

External links 
 TransMilenio
 www.surumbo.com official interactive query system TransMilenio maps

TransMilenio